Jim Grego (born November 8, 1955) is an American politician. He is a Republican representing the 17th district in the Oklahoma House of Representatives.

Political career 

In 2018, the former State Representative for District 17, Brian Renegar was unable to run for reelection due to term limits, and Grego ran for the open seat. Grego came in second in a five-way Republican primary, advancing to a runoff against Joshua Hass, which he won. He went on to defeat Peggy DeFrange in the general election.

As of July 2020, Grego sits on the following committees:
 Agriculture and Rural Development (Vice Chair)
 A&B Natural Resources and Regulatory Services
 Public Health
 Transportation

Electoral record

Personal life 

Grego was born in 1955 in McAlester, Oklahoma and earned a Bachelor's degree from Oklahoma State University in 1977. He and his wife, Sandy, have two children.

References 

Living people
Republican Party members of the Oklahoma House of Representatives
21st-century American politicians
People from McAlester, Oklahoma
People from Latimer County, Oklahoma
Oklahoma State University alumni
1955 births